"This Is the Night" is the debut single of American Idol contestant Clay Aiken, written by Chris Braide, Aldo Nova, and Gary Burr. It was released on June 10, 2003, on the RCA label, simultaneously with "Flying Without Wings" by rival contestant (and idol winner) Ruben Studdard. It became the 11th song in the history of the Billboard Hot 100 (and the first by a debut act) to debut at number one on that chart, restricting "Flying Without Wings" to the number-two position.

Internationally, "This Is the Night" was issued as a double A-side with Aiken's cover of Simon & Garfunkel's "Bridge over Troubled Water" in Canada and New Zealand, reaching number one in both countries. In both nations, the double A-side also kept "Flying Without Wings" from reaching the top spot.

Writing and inspiration
Although the song seems tailor-made as a potential show-winning song, it was not written specifically for American Idol. Co-writer Braide said in an interview with HitQuarters: "'This Is The Night' was written from the heart ... It was written after 9/11, and there's a line in it, 'Every kiss is a kiss/you can never get back', and it's about saying, to whoever you love out there, just appreciate them." American Idol creator Simon Fuller heard the song and said it was perfect for the show.

Release and chart performance
"Bridge over Trouble Water" / "This Is the Night" was released as a CD single and 7-inch single in the United States on June 10, 2003. Because of Billboards chart rules, only "This Is the Night" was listed on the Hot 100 chart since it received the highest cumulative airplay audience, appearing on the Billboard Adult Contemporary chart at number 30 and climbing to a peak of number 13 in August 2003. On June 28, 2003, "This Is the Night" debuted at number one on the Hot 100 with sales of 393,000, becoming the fastest-selling physical single since Elton John's "Candle in the Wind 1997" and the best-selling physical single of 2003, with 948,000 copies sold. It was also the first song by a debut act to top the Hot 100 during its first week on the chart.

On July 15, 2003, the double A-side single was certified platinum by the Recording Industry Association of America (RIAA), becoming the first CD single to go platinum since 2002, when Lee Ann Womack's "I Hope You Dance" sold a million copies after being released for over a year. The double A-side also topped the charts in New Zealand, where it is certified platinum, and in Canada, going six-times platinum. "This Is the Night" was included as a bonus track on Clay Aiken's Measure of a Man album.

Credits and personnel
Credits are lifted from the US CD single liner notes.

Studios
 Recorded at Rokstone Studios (London, England) and Westlake Audio (Los Angeles)
 Mixed at Mix This! (Pacific Palisades, California)
 Mastered at Sterling Sound (Chelsea, New York City)

Personnel

 Aldo Nova – writing
 Gary Burr – writing
 Chris Braide – writing
 Friðrik "Frizzy" Karlsson – guitars
 Steve Pearce – bass
 Steve Mac – keyboards, production
 Vinnie Colaiuta – drums
 Frank Ricotti – percussion
 Dave Arch – production
 Chris Laws – recording (Rokstone)
 Robin Sellars – recording (Westlake Audio)
 Bob Clearmountain – mixing
 Kevin Harp – assistant mix engineering
 Daniel Pursey – assistant engineering
 Jason Rankins – assistant engineering
 Clive Davis – executive production
 Ted Jensen – mastering

Charts

Weekly charts

Year-end charts

Certifications

See also
 List of Hot 100 number-one singles of 2003 (U.S.)

References

2003 debut singles
2003 songs
American Idol songs
Billboard Hot 100 number-one singles
Canadian Singles Chart number-one singles
Clay Aiken songs
Number-one singles in New Zealand
RCA Records singles
Song recordings produced by Steve Mac
Songs written by Aldo Nova
Songs written by Chris Braide
Songs written by Gary Burr